The 1998 NCAA Division I baseball tournament was played at the end of the 1998 NCAA Division I baseball season to determine the national champion of college baseball.  The tournament concluded with eight teams competing in the College World Series, a double-elimination tournament in its fifty-second year.  Eight regional competitions were held to determine the participants in the final event.  Each region was composed of six teams, resulting in 48 teams participating in the tournament at the conclusion of their regular season, and in some cases, after a conference tournament.  The fifty-second tournament's champion was Southern California, coached by Mike Gillespie. The championship was the Trojans' record 12th, but their first since 1978, the last under coach Rod Dedeaux. The Most Outstanding Player was USC second baseman Wes Rachels.

Regionals
The opening rounds of the tournament were played at eight regional sites across the country, each consisting of a six-team field. Each regional tournament is double-elimination, however region brackets are variable depending on the number of teams remaining after each round. Regional games were scheduled for Thursday, May 21 through Sunday, May 24; however, one final Sunday game (Arizona State vs. Georgia Tech at Wichita) had to be played the next day due to rainout. The winners of each regional advanced to the College World Series.

In the final year of the 48-team tournament, five regionals required the full 11 games. Florida State, LSU and Mississippi State advanced to the CWS unscathed.

Bold indicates winner.

East Regional at Clemson, SC

Atlantic I Regional at Coral Gables, FL

Atlantic II Regional at Tallahassee, FL

Central Regional at College Station, TX

Midwest Regional at Wichita, KS

South I Regional at Gainesville, FL

South II Regional at Baton Rouge, LA

West Regional at Stanford, CA

College World Series
The 1998 CWS was infamous for producing several high-scoring games, which was termed by media covering the Series as "Gorilla Ball" (or "Geaux-rilla Ball" among LSU fans), which placed a premium on home runs. LSU, which won the 1996 and 1997 national championships and set an NCAA record in 1997 by hitting 188 home runs, hit eight home runs in its first game (by seven different players) vs. USC, and added six more in its second game vs. Mississippi State to bring its season total to 157. Needing one victory to advance to the championship game for the third consecutive year, LSU fell twice to USC, hitting just one home run in 18 innings. USC and Pac-10 rival Arizona St. set numerous offensive records in the championship game, won by the Trojans 21–14.

Prior to the 1999 season, the NCAA adopted restrictions on aluminum bats, requiring the difference between the length and weight ("drop") of the bat to be no more than three (e.g. a 34-inch bat could not weigh less than 31 ounces). This reduced home run output slightly, but it was not until more sweeping changes in 2011 before aluminum bats would perform more like their wood counterparts.

Participants

Results

Bracket

Game results

All-Tournament Team
The following players were members of the College World Series All-Tournament Team.

Notable players
 Arizona State: Andrew Beinbrink, Willie Bloomquist, Ryan Mills
 Florida: Mark Ellis, Josh Fogg, David Ross, Brad Wilkerson
 Florida State: Kevin Cash
 Long Beach State: Mike Gallo
 LSU: Kurt Ainsworth, Randy Keisler
 Miami (FL): Pat Burrell, Bobby Hill, Aubrey Huff, Jason Michaels
 Mississippi State: Matt Ginter
 Southern California: Morgan Ensberg, Seth Etherton, Jason Lane, Eric Munson

See also
 1998 NCAA Division I softball tournament
 1998 NCAA Division II baseball tournament
 1998 NCAA Division III baseball tournament
 1998 NAIA World Series

References

NCAA Division I Baseball Championship
NCAA Division I Baseball Championship